Massa Centro railway station serves the town and comune of Massa, in the region of Tuscany, central Italy.  Opened in 1862, it forms part of the Pisa–La Spezia–Genoa railway.

The station is currently managed by Rete Ferroviaria Italiana (RFI).  However, the commercial area of the passenger building is managed by Centostazioni.  Train services to and from the station are operated by Trenitalia.  Each of these companies is a subsidiary of Ferrovie dello Stato (FS), Italy's state-owned rail company.

Location
Massa Centro railway station is situated in Piazza IV Novembre, to the south of the city centre.

History
The station was opened on 1 November 1862, upon the inauguration of the Massa–Seravezza section of the Pisa–La Spezia–Genoa railway.  Five months later, on 15 May 1863, the line was extended from Massa to Sarzana, in the neighbouring region of Liguria.

In 1939, the passenger building was renovated, to a design of the architect Roberto Narducci.

Features
The station has three tracks for passengers and two through tracks for goods traffic.

Track 1 serves trains bound for Pisa Centrale, and Track 2 is for trains heading for La Spezia Centrale.  Track 3 is used as both an exchange platform and for overtaking.  The platforms facing all three tracks have long marble canopies and are connected by an underpass.

There are also many monitors showing arrival and departure information in real time.

Passenger and train movements
The station has about 1.1 million passenger movements each year.

All regional trains passing through Massa Centro stop there, as do some InterCity, Eurostar City Italia and Eurostar Italia trains.

Interchange
The station is also served by urban and suburban bus lines.

See also

History of rail transport in Italy
List of railway stations in Tuscany
Rail transport in Italy
Railway stations in Italy

References

External links

This article is based upon a translation of the Italian language version as at December 2010.

Centro Station
Railway stations in Tuscany
Railway stations opened in 1862
1862 establishments in Italy
Railway stations in Italy opened in the 19th century